Arctia Oy is Finnish state-owned company responsible for operating a Finnish icebreaker fleet. The company was established as Arctia Shipping Oy in 2010 when Finnish icebreaking services were incorporated. The name of the parent company was changed to Arctia Oy on 18 January 2016. It has following subsidiaries: Arctia Icebreaking Oy (conventional icebreakers), Arctia Offshore Oy (multipurpose icebreakers), Arctia Karhu Oy (port icebreakers and towing), and Arctia Management Services Oy. Arctia has a floating office next to the icebreaker base at Katajanokka in Helsinki.

Arctia provides icebreaking services for Finnish Transport Agency during winter as well as for private companies in the offshore gas- and oilfields.

In 2013 Antti Viirtala, the chairman of the company resigned because of scandal related to the sponsorships of his own curling club.

History

Greenpeace case
In 2012 a group of Greenpeace activists got onboard icebreakers Fennica and Nordica and demanded that the company stops helping Royal Dutch Shell to drill oil in the Arctic Ocean. Arctia Shipping decided to make a criminal complaint in spite of the will of Minister Heidi Hautala who was responsible for the corporate governance of Arctia Shipping. Hautala's office threatened to fire the management in case that they disobliged.

In October 2013 Hautala decided to resign when the case became public.

Fleet

See also
 Finnish Transport Agency

References

Government-owned companies of Finland
Shipping companies of Finland
Companies based in Helsinki
Finnish companies established in 2010
Transport companies established in 2010